"Geliyorum Yanına" (En. I'm Coming to You) is a single by Turkish-Belgian singer Hadise, released in August 2019. It was written by Gülşen, arranged by Ozan Çolakoğlu and released as a promotional song for Fanta in Turkey. The song's music video was directed by Şenol Korkmaz, and shot over 32 hours with a crew of 70 people. It was first shown to the public during Hadise's concert at the Cemil Topuzlu Open-Air Theatre on 10 August 2019.

Track listing 
Digital download
 "Geliyorum Yanına" – 2:48

Release history

References 

2019 songs
Hadise songs
Turkish-language songs
Songs written by Gülşen (singer)